Marc Fossard (1912–2007) was a French cinematographer who worked on over a hundred films during his career.

Selected filmography
 Maria Chapdelaine (1934)
 Anne-Marie (1936)
 Beethoven's Great Love (1937)
 Pépé le Moko (1937)
 Woman of Malacca (1937)
 Coral Reefs (1939)
 Entente cordiale (1939)
 Children of Paradise (1945)
 The Black Cavalier (1945)
 The Heroic Monsieur Boniface (1949)
 The Red Angel (1949)
 Sending of Flowers (1950)
 The Marriage of Mademoiselle Beulemans (1950)
 Without Leaving an Address (1951)
 Mammy (1951)
 Maria of the End of the World (1951)
 Matrimonial Agency (1952)
 The Secret of the Mountain Lake (1952)
 The Girl with the Whip (1952)
 Poisson d'avril (1954)
 Pity for the Vamps (1956)
 Three Sailors (1957)
 Mandrin (1962)
 The Gorillas (1964)

References

Bibliography
 Turk, Edward Baron. Child of Paradise: Marcel Carné and the Golden Age of French Cinema. Harvard University Press, 1989.

External links

1912 births
2007 deaths
French cinematographers